Sheffield United Football Club is an English association football club based at Bramall Lane in Sheffield, South Yorkshire, who currently compete in the . Founded in 1889, they played only friendlies during their first year in existence before being elected to the Midland Counties League for the 1890–91 season. The football committee (who ran the club at the time) were unhappy with the quality of the Midland Counties League and so resigned in the summer of 1891. However, United were refused entry into The Football League amidst an acrimonious dispute with local rivals The Wednesday who had lobbied against their application. Instead United joined the newly formed Northern League which mainly consisted of teams from the North East of England, resulting in their nearest away fixture being at Darlington, some 85 miles away. Sheffield United again applied for election to The Football League the following year, this time being successful, and were admitted to the new Second Division in 1892. Despite the club's desire to be part of the Football League some committee members felt it may not last and so United remained with the Northern League for one more season, thus competing in two leagues concurrently during the 1892–93 season. Since that time United have remained in either the Football League, or at times the Premier League (during the 1992–93, 1993–94 and 2006–07 seasons), although changing fortunes have meant that they have competed in all four of the top divisions in England at some stage.

Sheffield United played their inaugural league fixture as part of the Midland Counties League on 13 September 1890 against the now defunct Burton Wanderers. Since that game they have faced 115 different sides in league football with their most regular opponent having been Blackburn Rovers, against whom United have played on 142 occasions since their first meeting on 15 January 1894. As such United have registered more wins against the Lancashire side than any other, triumphing on 55 occasions. The most league defeats suffered by United have come against West Midlands team Aston Villa who have beaten them on 59 occasions, while the most draws have been registered against cross-city rivals Sheffield Wednesday with whom they have shared the points in 39 games. The most recent new league opponents for Sheffield United have been AFC Wimbledon, who they first met on 10 September 2016 in a League One fixture.

Key
The records include the results of matches played in the Midland Counties League (from 1890 to 1891), Northern League (from 1891 to 1893), the Premier League (from 1992 to 1994 and 2006 to 2007) and The Football League (all other seasons). Wartime matches are regarded as unofficial and are excluded, as are matches from the abandoned 1939–40 season. Test Matches and play-off games are also not included.
For simplicity, clubs are listed under their name at the time of their last league fixture with United: for example, results against Ardwick are integrated into the records against Manchester City whilst the fixtures against Glossop are listed under the name the club had at the time rather than Glossop North End which they have subsequently become.
  Teams with this background and symbol in the "Club" column are current divisional rivals of Sheffield United.
  Clubs with this background and symbol in the "Club" column are defunct.
P = matches played; W = matches won; D = matches drawn; L = matches lost; F = Goals scored; A = Goals conceded; Win% = percentage of total matches won; First = Date of first league fixture; Last = Date of most recent league fixture

All-time league record
Sheffield United's first team has competed in a number of nationally contested leagues, and its record against each club faced in these competitions is listed below.

Statistics are correct as of 12 February 2023.

Notes

References
General

Specific

League Record By Opponent
Sheffield United
League record by opponent